Lawless Mountain (Spanish: La montaña sin ley) is a 1953 Spanish western film directed by Miguel Lluch and starring José Suárez, Isabel de Castro and Teresa Abad.

Cast
 José Suárez as Zorro  
 Isabel de Castro as María 
 Teresa Abad 
 Juan Balañá 
 Barta Barri 
 Jesús Colomer 
 Luis Induni 
 Paco Martínez Soria 
 Pedro Mascaró 
 Jorge Morales 
 Carlos Otero 
 José Manuel Pinillos 
 Ramón Quadreny 
 María Zaldívar

References

Bibliography 
 Pitts, Michael R. Western Movies: A Guide to 5,105 Feature Films. McFarland, 2012.

External links 
 

1953 Western (genre) films
Spanish Western (genre) films
1953 films
1950s Spanish-language films
Films directed by Miguel Lluch
Spanish black-and-white films
Films scored by Augusto Algueró
1950s Spanish films